Juan Luis Steegmann Olmedillas (born 8 July, 1955 in Madrid) is a Spanish scientist and doctor who has been a director of the European LeukemiaNet research group and the GELMC group of the Spanish Society of Hematology.

He is also a politician and has represented the Vox party in the Congress of Deputies since 2019.

Biography

Career
Olmedillas was born in Madrid in 1955. He worked at the Hospital Universitario de la Princesa where he became an expert in hemotherapy. He was a founding member and later a director of the European LeukemiaNet group, an EU based organisation which seeks to research cancer and adverse drug effects.

Following the COVID-19 outbreak in Spain, Olmedillas argued that the Spanish government should look to South Korea on how to prevent the spread and accused Fernando Simón and the Spanish government of mismanaging the pandemic by not making public testing more available while giving unreliable casualty predictions which he claimed led to more deaths and Spain implementing a stricter lockdown.

Politics
Olmedillas stated that he sympathized with Marxism during his time as a student and was a communist until visiting the Soviet Union in the 1980s. He was then a member of the PSOE until the 2004 Madrid train bombings. He became a member of Vox through becoming acquainted with Santiago Abascal.

In 2019, he was elected to the Congress of Deputies for Vox representing the Madrid constituency. He is also the party's spokesman on healthcare matters.

References 

1955 births
Living people
Members of the 13th Congress of Deputies (Spain)
Members of the 14th Congress of Deputies (Spain)
Vox (political party) politicians
Spanish scientists
Spanish Marxists
Spanish Socialist Workers' Party politicians